17th SDFCS Awards
December 11, 2012

Best Film: 
Argo

Best Director: 
Ben Affleck
Argo

The 17th San Diego Film Critics Society Awards were announced on December 11, 2012.

Winners and nominees

Best Actor
Daniel Day-Lewis – Lincoln
Bradley Cooper – Silver Linings Playbook
John Hawkes – The Sessions
Hugh Jackman – Les Misérables
Joaquin Phoenix – The Master

Best Actress
Michelle Williams – Take This Waltz
Jessica Chastain – Zero Dark Thirty
Helen Hunt – The Sessions
Jennifer Lawrence – Silver Linings Playbook
Naomi Watts – The Impossible

Best Animated Film
ParaNorman
Brave
Frankenweenie
Rise of the Guardians
Wreck-It Ralph

Best Cinematography
Life of Pi – Claudio MirandaBeasts of the Southern Wild – Ben Richardson
Django Unchained – Robert Richardson
The Master – Mihai Mălaimare Jr.
Les Misérables – Danny Cohen

Best DirectorBen Affleck – Argo
Paul Thomas Anderson – The Master
Kathryn Bigelow – Zero Dark Thirty
Ang Lee – Life of Pi
David O. Russell – Silver Linings Playbook

Best Documentary
The Invisible War
Bully
Jiro Dreams of Sushi
The Queen of Versailles
Samsara

Best Editing
Argo – William GoldenbergKilling Them Softly – Brian A. Kates and John Paul Horstmann
Life of Pi – Tim Squyres
The Master – Leslie Jones and Peter McNulty
Zero Dark Thirty – William Goldenberg and Dylan Tichenor

Best Ensemble PerformanceThe Perks of Being a Wallflower
Argo
Django Unchained
Les Misérables
Seven Psychopaths

Best Film
Argo
Django Unchained
The Master
Silver Linings Playbook
Zero Dark Thirty

Best Foreign Language Film
The Kid with a Bike (Le gamin au vélo) • Belgium / France / ItalyAmour • Austria / France / Germany
Headhunters (Hodejegerne) • Norway
Holy Motors • France / Germany
The Intouchables (Intouchables) • France

Best Production DesignCloud Atlas – Hugh Bateup and Uli HanischAnna Karenina – Sarah Greenwood
Argo – Sharon Seymour
Les Misérables – Eve Stewart
Moonrise Kingdom – Adam Stockhausen

Best ScoreThe Master – Jonny GreenwoodArgo – Alexandre Desplat
Beasts of the Southern Wild – Benh Zeitlin and Dan Romer
Life of Pi – Mychael Danna
Moonrise Kingdom – Alexandre Desplat

Best Original ScreenplayThe Master – Paul Thomas AndersonThe Cabin in the Woods – Joss Whedon and Drew Goddard
Django Unchained – Quentin Tarantino
Moonrise Kingdom – Wes Anderson and Roman Coppola
Take This Waltz – Sarah Polley

Best Adapted ScreenplayArgo – Chris TerrioLife of Pi – David Magee
Lincoln – Tony Kushner
The Perks of Being a Wallflower – Stephen Chbosky
Silver Linings Playbook – David O. Russell

Best Supporting ActorChristoph Waltz – Django Unchained
Alan Arkin – Argo
Philip Seymour Hoffman – The Master
Matthew McConaughey – Killer Joe
Christopher Walken – Seven Psychopaths

Best Supporting Actress
Emma Watson – The Perks of Being a Wallflower
Amy Adams – The Master
Samantha Barks – Les Misérables
Anne Hathaway – Les Misérables
Rebel Wilson – Pitch Perfect

References
 San Diego Film Critics Select Top Films for 2012

External links
 Official Site

2
2012 film awards
2012 in American cinema